Dosut is a village in the Neelum Valley of Azad Kashmir, Pakistan. It is located 142 km from Muzaffarabad, and 6 km from Sharda.

Divisions 
Dosut is divided into small settlements. These settlements include Naka, Shaper Naka Molvi Shah Seri, Chan Basti, Khawaja Basti, Konsh and Khar Basti.

Languages and people 
The languages spoken here are Kashmiri & Hindko. Urdu is used as secondary language (lingua franca).
The people of Dosut are very hospitable. Most of the people are engaged in agriculture while others are engaged in government employment and business.
Usually, the crop which is growing here is corn.

Gallery

References 

Populated places in Neelam District